John L. Briley (June 26, 1907 – November 19, 1998) was an American football player and coach. He served as the head football coach and head basketball coach at Augustana College in Rock Island, Illinois. Briley was a three-time lettermen at Drake University in Des Moines, Iowa.

Head coaching record

Football

References

1907 births
1998 deaths
Augustana (Illinois) Vikings baseball coaches
Augustana (Illinois) Vikings football coaches
Augustana (Illinois) Vikings men's basketball coaches
Basketball coaches from Iowa
Drake Bulldogs football players
People from Kossuth County, Iowa
Players of American football from Iowa